Hawea Karepa Mataira (3 December 1910 – 15 November 1979) was a dual-code rugby football player who represented New Zealand in both rugby union and rugby league.

Rugby union career
Mataira made his first class debut in 1931 and in 1932 made his debut for Hawke's Bay. He went on to play 35 first class matches for Hawke's Bay between 1932 and 1936.

In 1934 he made his All Blacks debut on a tour of Australia. The next year he was a surprise omission from the 1935–36 tour of Great Britain. Mataira also represented New Zealand Māori.

In 1936 Mataira became involved in a dispute with a teammate over a jersey. His teammate, Bernard Edward Rogers was knocked down during the fight and suffered a fractured skull after striking his head as he fell. He died from his injuries. Mataira was charged with manslaughter but was acquitted after it was found that Rogers had been the aggressor and Mataira had tried hard to avoid coming to blows.

Rugby league career
Mataira switched codes in 1937, moving to Auckland and joining the City Rovers club in the Auckland Rugby League competition. Mataira later joined the Manukau club. He was selected for the New Zealand national rugby league team 1939 tour of Great Britain and France but the tour was cancelled before any Test matches were played due to the outbreak of World War II.

After the War, Mataira represented New Zealand Māori against several touring sides.

References

1979 deaths
1910 births
Dual-code rugby internationals
New Zealand rugby union players
New Zealand international rugby union players
Māori All Blacks players
New Zealand rugby league players
New Zealand national rugby league team players
Auckland rugby league team players
New Zealand Māori rugby league players
New Zealand Māori rugby league team players
City Rovers players
Manukau Magpies players
Rugby league props
People from Nūhaka
Hawke's Bay rugby union players
Rugby league players from Hawke's Bay Region
Rugby union players from the Hawke's Bay Region